The Indian Journal of Law and Technology is an annual peer-reviewed, student-edited, open access law journal published by India's premier law school, the National Law School of India University (Bangalore, India). 

The journal was established in 2005 and is the first and only Indian law journal  devoted exclusively to the study of the interface between law and technology. The journal carries scholarship in the areas of intellectual property, internet governance, information and communications technology, privacy, digital rights, and media law, along with focusing on developing country perspectives on contemporary issues involving the intersection of law, technology, industry and policy. 

IJLT is one of top ranked law journals in India, and is indexed on international legal research databases such as Westlaw and HeinOnline. Previous issues have featured articles by distinguished authors such as Jonathan Zittrain (Harvard Law School), Yochai Benkler (Author of "The Wealth of Networks"), Justice Michael Kirby (High Court of Australia), Justice Prathiba M. Singh (Judge, Delhi High Court), Professor Stephan Hobe (International Institute of Space Law), Eben Moglen (Founder, Software Freedom Law Center), Elonnai Hickok (Carnegie Endowment for International Peace), Dr. Carolyn Johnston (University of Melbourne), Tina van der Linden (Vrije Universiteit Amsterdam), Justice S. Muralidhar (Chief Justice of Orissa High Court), and late Prof. Shamnad Basheer (Founder, SpicyIP). 

The journal is now in its 18th volume. It has previously published special issues on Privacy and Net-Neutrality.

In 2020, the journal was recognised for its academic quality and publishing ethics by the University Grants Commission (India), by its inclusion in the UGC-CARE List. The journal runs an online blog, and organises symposiums and conferences, to generate interest in the interface of law and technology.

Editors-in-chief
The following persons have been editors-in-chief of the journal:

References

External links 
 

Indian law journals
English-language journals
Annual journals
Publications established in 2005
Law journals edited by students